Weirton Heights is a neighborhood of Weirton, West Virginia, United States.

Weirton Heights is located along WV 105 east of downtown Weirton.

References 

Neighborhoods in West Virginia